A Panoramic View of London, from the Tower of St. Margaret's Church, Westminster is a painting made in 1815 by Pierre Prévost, acquired by the Museum of London in July 2018. It is particularly significant for its depiction of the pre-1834 Palace of Westminster.

Creation 

The work uses watercolour and bodycolour over pencil, on paper, which has been mounted on canvass. It is a sketch for a larger work, now lost, which was displayed as a visitor attraction in Paris.

Depictions 

Prévost painted the view from the tower of St. Margaret's, including (from left to right):

 Westminster Abbey (part)
 Guildhall
 Whitehall
 St Martin-in-the-Fields
 St James's Park
 Banqueting House
 River Thames
 Waterloo Bridge (under construction)
 St Paul's Cathedral
 Westminster Bridge
 Palace of Westminster
 Westminster Abbey

This was before the 1834 fire which destroyed much of the Palace of Westminster; and the Palace's subsequent rebuilding.

Provenance 

On 4 July 2018, the painting was auctioned at Sotheby's in London, after being re-found in the south of France. It was purchased for £250,000 by the Museum of London, with partial funding by the Art Fund.

References 

1815 paintings
Museum of London
Watercolor paintings
Cityscape paintings
London in popular culture